is a Japanese footballer currently playing as a midfielder for Azul Claro Numazu.

Career statistics

Club
.

Notes

References

1996 births
Living people
Sportspeople from Fukuoka Prefecture
Association football people from Fukuoka Prefecture
Fukuoka University alumni
Japanese footballers
Japan youth international footballers
Association football midfielders
Japan Football League players
J3 League players
FC Imabari players
Verspah Oita players
Azul Claro Numazu players